Zayzun  is a Syrian village located in Al-Ziyarah Nahiyah in Al-Suqaylabiyah District, Hama.  According to the Syria Central Bureau of Statistics (CBS), Zayzun had a population of 1944 in the 2004 census.

See also

Zeyzoun Dam

References 

Populated places in al-Suqaylabiyah District
Populated places in al-Ghab Plain